Hans Lundgren (born 3 November 1957), better known as Dolph Lundgren, is a Swedish actor, filmmaker and martial artist. His breakthrough came in 1985, when he starred in Rocky IV as the imposing Soviet boxer Ivan Drago. Since then, Lundgren has starred in more than 80 films, most of them in the action genre.

Lundgren received a degree in chemical engineering from the KTH Royal Institute of Technology in the early 1980s and a master's degree in chemical engineering from the University of Sydney in 1982. He holds the rank of 4th dan black belt in Kyokushin karate and was European champion in 1980–81. While in Sydney, he became a bodyguard for Jamaican singer Grace Jones and began a relationship with her. He received a Fulbright scholarship to MIT and moved to Boston. Jones convinced him to leave the university and move to New York City to be with her and begin acting, where, after a short stint as a model and bouncer at the Manhattan nightclub The Limelight, Lundgren got a small debut role as a KGB henchman in the James Bond film A View to a Kill.

After appearing in Rocky IV, Lundgren portrayed He-Man in the 1987 science fantasy film Masters of the Universe, Lt. Nikolai Petrovitch Rachenko in Red Scorpion (1988) and Frank Castle in the 1989 film The Punisher. Throughout the 1990s he appeared in films such as I Come in Peace (1990), Showdown in Little Tokyo (1991), Universal Soldier film series (1992, 2009, 2012), Joshua Tree (1993), Men of War (1994), Johnny Mnemonic (1995), Silent Trigger (1996), and Blackjack (1998). In 2004 he directed his first film, The Defender, and subsequently directed The Mechanik (2005), Missionary Man (2007), Command Performance (2009), Icarus (2010), Castle Falls (2021) and upcoming film Wanted Man (2023), also starring in all of them.

After a long spell performing in direct-to-video films since 1995, Lundgren returned to Hollywood in 2010 with the role of Gunner Jensen in The Expendables, alongside Sylvester Stallone and an all-action star cast. He reprised his role in The Expendables 2 (2012) and The Expendables 3 (2014). Also in 2014, he co-starred in Skin Trade, an action thriller about human trafficking he co-wrote and produced. He reprised his role of Ivan Drago in Creed II (2018), and is due to reprise his role as Gunner Jensen in The Expendables 4. He appears in Aquaman (2018), playing the father of Mera. He also had a recurring role in the fifth season of Arrow as Bratva leader Konstantin Kovar, the main antagonist of the season's flashback storyline.

Early life

Hans Lundgren was born on 3 November 1957 in Spånga, the son of Sigrid Birgitta ( Tjerneld; 1932–1992), a language teacher, and Karl Hugo Johan Lundgren (1923–2000), an engineer (M.Sc.) and economist (MBA) for the Swedish government. He lived in Spånga until the age of 13, when he moved to his grandparents' home in Nyland, Ångermanland. Some sources wrongly state 1959 as his year of birth, but Lundgren himself has confirmed it to be 1957. He has two sisters, Katarina and Annika and a younger brother Johan. Lundgren claims his father was physically abusive and vented his frustration on his wife and eldest son. He has stated that, during his tirades, his father would call him a "loser", which motivated him later as he grew more ambitious to prove himself. But he also said, "I still love my father, no matter what happened. There are many things about him I still admire. As a child, I was probably too much like him, very stubborn—perhaps that's what he couldn't deal with." He has cited his troubled relationship with his father as the reason he developed a desire to participate in heavy contact sports such as boxing and karate.

He was first credited as Dolph Lundgren with the release of Rocky IV. The name "Dolph" came from a relative on his mother's side.

Lundgren has said that, as a child, he was insecure and suffered from allergies, describing himself as a "runt". He showed a keen interest in drumming and had aspirations to become a rock star. At age seven, he tried judo and Gōjū-ryū. He took up Kyokushin karate at the age of 10, and began lifting weights as a teenager. Lundgren stated that "My dad always told me that if I wanted to make something special with my life, I had to go to America." After graduating from high school with straight A's, he spent some time in the United States in the 1970s on various academic scholarships, studying chemical engineering at Washington State University and Clemson University. He studied chemical engineering for a year at Washington State University between 1975 and 1976, prior to serving his mandatory one year in the Swedish Coastal Artillery at the Coastal Ranger School. In the late 1970s, he enrolled at the Royal Institute of Technology in Stockholm and graduated with a degree in chemical engineering.

Amidst his years of studying, Lundgren honed his karate skills by training hard in the dojo for five years, attaining the rank of 2nd dan black belt in Kyokushin in 1978. He captained the Swedish Kyokushin karate team, and was a formidable challenger at the 1979 World Open Tournament (arranged by the Kyokushin Karate Organization) when he was only a green belt. He won the European championships in 1980 and 1981, and a heavyweight tournament in Australia in 1982. In 1982, Lundgren graduated with a master's degree in chemical engineering from the University of Sydney. During his time in Sydney, he earned a living as a bouncer in a nightclub in the notorious King's Cross area.

Lundgren was awarded a Fulbright Scholarship to MIT in 1983. However, while preparing for the move to Boston, he was spotted in the nightclub where he worked in Sydney and was hired by Grace Jones as a bodyguard, and the two became lovers. Their relationship developed dramatically, and he moved with her to New York City. While living with Jones in her New York City apartment, Lundgren dabbled in modeling at the Zoli Agency but was described as "a bit too tall and muscular for a model's size 40". He earned a living as a bouncer at the Manhattan nightclub The Limelight, which was housed in the former Episcopal Church of the Holy Communion, working with Chazz Palminteri. In the daytime, he studied drama at the Warren Robertson Theatre Workshop and has said that "my time in New York City opened up my adolescent Swedish eyes to a multitude of different people and lifestyles, mostly in the arts. I hung out with Andy Warhol, Keith Haring, Iman and Steve Rubell, danced at Studio 54, and studied acting with Andie MacDowell and Tom Hulce." Friends told him he should be in movies. He would later quit studying at MIT after two weeks to pursue acting.

Career

1980s
On the set of the James Bond film A View to a Kill, Jones suggested that he try out for a part in the film, which led to his feature film debut playing the very minor role of a suited KGB henchman named Venz. In the film, Lundgren appears in the scene in which the KGB's General Gogol (Walter Gotell) confronts Max Zorin (Christopher Walken) about leaving the KGB, at a racing ground and ends in a minor brawl in which Lundgren's character Venz points a gun at Zorin. Roger Moore, in his last performance as James Bond, once memorably said, "Dolph is larger than Denmark". Lundgren found the entertainment business more attractive and rewarding than chemical engineering, so he decided to pursue a career in acting despite having no formal training. Upon learning that Sylvester Stallone was seeking an imposing fighter to play Ivan Drago in Rocky IV (1985), Lundgren sent videos and pictures of himself to a distant contact of Stallone, eventually reaching him. Lundgren tried out for the role, but as he himself has stated, he was initially turned down because he was too tall.

However, he eventually beat 5,000 other hopefuls to land his breakout role opposite Stallone, Carl Weathers, and Brigitte Nielsen. To improve his physique and athletic abilities, he trained intensely in bodybuilding and boxing for five months before the film was shot. Lundgren said, "We trained six days a week—weights in the morning for about an hour, then boxing in the afternoon. We did a split of chest and back one day and then shoulders, legs, and arms the next. We boxed for an hour and a half, practiced the fight choreography, and did bag work and abs." His character's lines "If he dies, he dies" and "I must break you" are amongst the best known of the Rocky series, and have often been cited in popular culture. Stallone was injured after a fight with Lundgren that Stallone had suggested as part of the filming process. Regarding this incident, Stallone said in an interview, "I went to the emergency room. My blood pressure was like 290, and they put me on a low-level flight to St. John's Hospital where I was put into intensive care because the pericardial sac around my heart was swelling and impeding the beating of my heart. I was there, like I said, for nine days surrounded by nuns. Not good." Lundgren later fought in a real boxing match against former UFC fighter Oleg Taktarov, and lost via decision. Lundgren has highlighted the premiere of Rocky IV at Westwood Movie Theatre as the moment which changed his life, remarking, "I walked in to a Westwood movie theater as Grace Jones' boyfriend and walked out ninety minutes later as the movie star Dolph Lundgren. I was shell-shocked for years from the mind-boggling and daunting experience of being a student-athlete from tiny Sweden suddenly having to live up a new action-star persona."

In 1987, Lundgren released on home media a workout video called Maximum Potential, and got his first lead role as He-Man in Masters of the Universe, based on the popular children's toyline and cartoon. He starred alongside Frank Langella, Meg Foster, Chelsea Field, Billy Barty and Courteney Cox. The film was a critical failure and viewed as far too violent for a family picture. It is referred to as a "flop" by Variety magazine, and has a 13% "rotten" rating at Rotten Tomatoes. Lundgren was criticized for being too wooden as a leading man, and it was dismissed as "a glossy fantasy starring monosyllabic Dolph Lundgren".

He next starred in Joseph Zito's Red Scorpion in 1988, opposite M. Emmet Walsh, Al White, T. P. McKenna and Carmen Argenziano. The plot centers on Lundgren's character Nikolai, a Soviet Spetsnaz-trained KGB agent who is sent to an African country where Soviet, Czechoslovakian and Cuban forces support the government's fight against an anti-communist rebel movement. Nikolai is ordered to assassinate the movement's leader, but eventually switches sides. The film was partly shot in Namibia and it was claimed that Grace Jones joined him during production in Swakopmund, insisting on staying in a $3000-a-month villa, even though his girlfriend at the time was reported to be Paula Barbieri. The film was poorly received and has an 11% "rotten" rating at Rotten Tomatoes. Stephen Holden of The New York Times said, "Dolph Lundgren's pectorals are the real stars of Red Scorpion, an action-adventure movie set in the fictional African country of Mombaka. Filmed from below so that one has the sense of peering up at a massive kinetic sculpture, his glistening torso, which over the course of the film is subjected to assorted tortures, is the movie's primary visual focus whenever the action slows down. And since Mr. Lundgren remains stone-faced, rarely speaking except to issue commands in a surprisingly hesitant monotone, his heaving chest actually communicates more emotion than his mumbling lips."

Lundgren then starred as Marvel Comics character Frank Castle (a.k.a. The Punisher) in the 1989 film The Punisher. The film was directed by Mark Goldblatt, with a screenplay by Boaz Yakin. Although it is based on the Marvel Comics character, the film changes many details of the original comic book origin and the main character does not wear the trademark "skull". The Punisher was filmed in Sydney, Australia and also featured Louis Gossett Jr., Jeroen Krabbé, Kim Miyori, and Barry Otto. The film received mainly negative reviews, currently holds a 24% "rotten" rating at Rotten Tomatoes. Christopher Null gave the film 1 out of 5, stating the film was "marred by cheeseball sets and special effects, lame fight sequences, and some of the worst acting ever to disgrace the screen." Whilst criticizing the film's storyline and acting, Time Out magazine concluded the film was "destructive, reprehensible, and marvelous fun".

1990s

1990–1994

In 1990, Lundgren starred in Craig R. Baxley's sci-fi thriller I Come in Peace (also known as Dark Angel) opposite Brian Benben, Betsy Brantley, Matthias Hues and Jay Bilas. Lundgren plays a tough Houston cop with an inner sensitivity, who does not let the rules of police procedure prevent him pursuing his mission to wipe out a gang of drug dealers who killed his partner. Lundgren said of his role, "What attracted me to Dark Angel is that I get to do more than just action. There's some romance, some comedy, some drama. I actually have some clever dialogue in this one. I get to act." One author said "Universe (1987) or Dark Angel (1990), demonstrates that nature and his [Lundgren's] hairdresser have suited him perfectly to Nazi genetically engineered baddie roles."

In 1991, Lundgren starred in Manny Coto's action film Cover Up opposite Louis Gossett Jr. Lundgren portrays a US Marine veteran turned reporter and who finds his own life in jeopardy after stumbling across a political cover-up over a Middle Eastern terrorist plan to kill thousands of people. The primary terrorist group in the film is the fictional group Black October, in reference to Black September. The film was shot in Israel.

Later in 1991, Lundgren appeared in martial arts action film Showdown in Little Tokyo opposite Brandon Lee. In the film, Lee and Lundgren play cops who are partnered to investigate yakuzas. The film received a mainly negative reception from critics and was criticized for its violence; Vincent Canby of The New York Times described it as "violent, but spiritless." Variety wrote "Lundgren can hold his own with other action leads as an actor and could easily be Van Damme-marketable if only he'd devote as much attention to quality control as he does to pectoral development." David J. Fox of the Los Angeles Times, however, described the film as a "class act", and some retrospective critics find it to be entertaining for its genre.

In 1992, Lundgren starred in one of the biggest blockbusters of the year in the sci-fi action picture Universal Soldier directed by Roland Emmerich. Lundgren (as Sergeant Andrew Scott) and Jean-Claude Van Damme (as Luc Deveraux) play U.S. soldiers during the Vietnam War who are sent to secure a village against North Vietnamese forces. However they end up shooting each other dead after Devereaux discovers that Scott has gone insane and has resorted to torture and kill the villagers. They are later reanimated in a secret Army project along with a large group of other previously dead soldiers and sent on a mission as GR operatives. At the 1992 Cannes Film Festival, Van Damme and Lundgren were involved in a verbal altercation that almost turned physical when both men pushed each other only to be separated, but it was believed to have only been a publicity stunt. Universal Soldier opened in theatres on 10 July 1992, a moderate success domestically with $36,299,898 in US ticket sales, but a major blockbuster worldwide, making over $65 million overseas, which earned the film a total of $102 million worldwide, on a $23 million budget. Despite being a box office hit however, it was not well-received; mainstream critics dismissed the movie as a Terminator 2 clone. Film critic Roger Ebert said, "it must be fairly thankless to play lunks who have to fight for the entire length of a movie while exchanging monosyllabic idiocies", including it in his book I hated, hated, hated this movie.

In 1993, Lundgren starred opposite Kristian Alfonso and George Segal in Vic Armstrong's Joshua Tree. Lundgren plays Wellman Anthony Santee, a former racecar driver who has turned to hauling exotic stolen cars with his friend Eddie Turner (Ken Foree). One day he is framed by police officer Frank Severance (Segal) for the murder of a highway patrolman, also killing his friend Eddie. Santee is sent to prison after recovering in a prison hospital, but escapes during transfer and takes a female hostage named Rita Marrick (Alfonso) at a gas station, not suspecting that she's a cop. On the run from the law, involving exotic cars and desert scenery, Santee must prove his innocence and prove Severance guilty of being involved in the car ring and for murder. Much of the film was filmed in the Alabama Hills of the Sierra Nevada and the desert of the Joshua Tree National Park of southeast California.

In 1994, Lundgren starred in Bruce Malmuth's Pentathlon as an East German Olympic gold medalist pentathlete on the run from an abusive coach (David Soul). Lundgren trained with the U.S. pentathlon team in preparation for the role, which later led to him being selected to serve as the (non-competing) Team Leader of the 1996 U.S. Olympic Modern Pentathlon team during the Atlanta Games, to promote the image of the sport and to coordinate planning and other details between the team and the United States Olympic Committee. The film was seen negatively by most critics; Film Review said it was "appallingly acted and monotonous" and Video Movie Guide 2002 described it as a "silly Cold War thriller".

Later in 1994, Lundgren appeared in Perry Lang's Men of War (scripted by John Sayles) alongside Charlotte Lewis and BD Wong as Nick Gunar, a former Special Ops soldier who leads a group of mercenaries to a treasure island in the South China Sea. The film was mainly shot in Thailand, with Krabi and Phong Nga making up most of the island scenery. The film was well received by some critics. One author said "Men of War invokes the most vividly remembered fighting in a foreign land of recent Western history. This innovation, associating the muscle image with the Vietnam experience, is carried over into other contemporary muscle films." Another said, "fine performances by an all-star Dolph Lundgren as a mercenary assigned to "convince" a cast in this offbeat and disturbing film."

1995–1999
In 1995, Lundgren appeared in Robert Longo's Johnny Mnemonic, co-starring Keanu Reeves. The film portrays screenwriter William Gibson's dystopian cyberpunk view of the future with the world dominated by megacorporations and with strong East Asian influences. Reeves plays the title character, a man with a cybernetic brain implant designed to store information. Lundgren plays Karl Honig, a Jesus-obsessed hitman and street preacher who wears a robe and carries a shepherd's staff. The film was shot on location in Toronto and Montreal in 12 weeks, filling in for the film's Newark, New Jersey and Beijing settings. The film was premiered in Japan first on 15 April 1995 and features a previously composed score by Michael Danna, different editing, and more scenes with Lundgren and Japanese star Takeshi Kitano. Critical response was negative overall; Roger Ebert said, "Johnny Mnemonic is one of the great gestures of recent cinema, a movie which doesn't deserve one nanosecond of serious analysis." The film was a financial disappointment, grossing $19,075,720 in the domestic American market against its $26m budget. The cloak worn by Lundgren in the film is now located in the lobby of the Famous Players Coliseum in Mississauga, Ontario, it was his last theatrical release film until 2010. Later in 1995, Lundgren appeared in Ted Kotcheff's The Shooter, an action drama in which he plays Michael Dane, a U.S. Marshall who gets caught up in politics when he is hired to solve the assassination of a Cuban ambassador.

In 1996, Lundgren starred in Russell Mulcahy's Silent Trigger, about a sniper (Lundgren) and his female spotter (played by Gina Bellman). Lundgren plays a former Special Forces agent who joins a secretive government agency (called "The Agency") as an assassin. The movie takes place in and around an unfinished city skyscraper, shot in Montreal. The Motion Picture Guide to the films of 1997 said, "this stylish but empty thriller gives square-jawed Dolph Lundgren another shot at straight-to-video immortality".

In 1997, Lundgren starred in Frédéric Forestier's The Peacekeeper, playing Major Frank Cross of the US Air Force and the only man who can prevent the president being assassinated and with the ability to thwart an imminent nuclear holocaust. The threat is from a terrorist group, which has stolen the President's personal communications computer with the capability of launching the US arsenal to threaten global security. The film co-starred Michael Sarrazin, Montel Williams, Roy Scheider and Christopher Heyerdahl, and was shot on location in Montreal. The film was praised for its exciting action sequences. Doug Pratt described the first half of the film as "excellent" and described Lundgren's character as "tenacious", although Robert Cettl wrote "the Peacekeeper trades on the presence of B-movie action star Dolph Lundgren, an actor who never became as popular as his action contemporaries Jean-Claude Van Damme and Steven Seagal."

In 1998, he appeared in Jean-Marc Piché's action/supernatural horror film The Minion alongside Françoise Robertson Lundgren portrays Lukas Sadorov, a middle eastern templar and member of an order who are charged with guarding the gateway to Hell that, if opened, will unleash all evil. The only thing that can open it is a key which is sought by the Minion, a demonic spirit that transfers itself into the nearby host body when his previous one is killed off. Awakening in New York City, the Minion tracks down Karen Goodleaf as Lukas arrives to America to protect her and the key. Michael Haag in his book Templars: History and Myth: From Solomon's Temple to the Freemasons (2009) said, "The budget for this film was $12 million. A pity they did not spend a cent on research (citing that one reference was 600 years out) ... Lundgren is a butt-kicking Templar monk with a spiked leather glove whose sacred duty it is to do what the Templars have always done and stop a key that has kept the Anti-christ imprisoned for thousands of years from falling into the right hands.". The DVD and Video Guide of 2005 described the film as being "possibly one of the worst films ever".

Later in 1998, Lundgren appeared alongside Bruce Payne and Claire Stansfield in Sweepers as Christian Erickson, a leading demolition expert and head of an elite team of specialists, trained to disarm mine fields in a humanitarian minesweeping operation in Angola. The Video Guide to 2002 said, "that noise you hear isn't the numerous on-screen explosions but action star Lundgren's career hitting rock bottom." He also featured in the TV pilot Blackjack (directed by John Woo) as a former US Marshal who has a phobia of the color white, who becomes the bodyguard and detective of a young supermodel (Kam Heskin) who is the target of a psychotic assassin (Phillip MacKenzie). Shot on location in Toronto, the film was originally meant to be the pilot episode of a series focusing around his character, Jack Devlin but it was not accepted as a series as it was poorly received. One review said "the narrative is laughably stupid" and the DVD and Video Guide to 2005 said, "dull, lightweight, made-for-TV action fully to a satisfying climax".

In 1999, he played a mercenary in Isaac Florentine's Bridge of Dragons, a military pilot in Anthony Hickox's Storm Catcher, and a cop who's a former boxer in Jill Rips, also directed by Hickox, based on a 1987 novel by Scottish writer Frederic Lindsay.

2000s

2000–2004
In 2000, Lundgren starred in The Last Warrior as Captain Nick Preston under director Sheldon Lettich. The film was partly shot in Eilat, Israel. Later in 2000, Lundgren appeared in Damian Lee's Agent Red (also known as Captured), alongside Alexander Kuznetsov, Natalie Radford and Randolph Mantooth. The film is set during the Cold War, and is about two soldiers trapped on a submarine with a group of terrorists who plan to use a chemical weapon against the United States. Lundgren's character, Matt Hendricks, must work with his wife, a virologist, to prevent the scenario occurring. After the film was completed, producer Andrew Stevens thought it was too poor to be released and multiple people had to be hired to at least make the film half-competent. The film was very poorly received, given its "shoestring budget"; the DVD and Film Guide of 2005 wrote, "low-budget mess stars Dolph Lundgren as a navy special operations commander trying to keep a deadly virus out of the hands of terrorists. This subpar effort sinks to the bottom of the ocean in a tidal wave of cliche." During an interview on The Tonight Show with Jay Leno in May 2008, Gladiator director Ridley Scott said Lundgren had been considered for the part of undefeated fighter Tigris of Gaul in 2000, but was eventually rejected because "as an actor, he just didn't fit in with what we were trying to achieve".

In 2001, Lundgren starred in Hidden Agenda, directed by Marc S. Grenier. He plays Jason Price, an ex-FBI agent who protects a witness. In 2003, Lundgren featured in Sidney J. Furie's Detention.

In 2004, he appeared opposite Polly Shannon in Direct Action under Sidney J. Furie, portraying Sergeant Frank Gannon, an officer who has spent the last three years on the Direct Action Unit (DAU) task force, fighting gang crime and corruption and after he leaves he is hunted down by former colleagues for betraying the brotherhood. Next Lundgren made a cameo in Ed Bye's Fat Slags, alongside Geri Halliwell, Naomi Campbell and Angus Deayton. His next starring role was in the science fiction picture Retrograde. In it Lundgren plays a man who is in a group of genetically unique people who travel back in time to prevent the discovery of meteors containing deadly bacteria." Shot in Italy, the film received the support of the Film Fund of Luxembourg.

He made his directorial debut, replacing Sidney J. Furie who got ill during pre-production, with The Defender, in which he also starred alongside Shakara Ledard and Jerry Springer, who played the President of the United States. Lundgren plays Lance Rockford, the bodyguard of the head of the National Security Agency, Roberta Jones (Caroline Lee-Johnson), in a war on terror.

2005–2009
In 2005, Lundgren starred and directed his second picture The Mechanik (The Russian Specialist), playing a retired Russian Special Forces hitman Nikolai "Nick" Cherenko caught in the crossfire with Russian mobsters. Sky Movies remarked that The Mechanik is "hardcore death-dealing from the Nordic leviathan" and said that "The Mechanik delivers all the no-nonsense gunplay you'd want of a Friday night".

In 2006, Lundgren played gladiator Brixos in the Italian-made historical/biblical drama, The Inquiry (L'inchiesta) a remake of a 1986 film by the same name, in an ensemble that includes Daniele Liotti, Mónica Cruz, Max von Sydow, F. Murray Abraham and Ornella Muti. Set in AD 35 in the Roman Empire, the story follows a fictional Roman general named Titus Valerius Taurus, a veteran of campaigns in Germania, who is sent to Judea by the emperor Tiberius to investigate the possibility of the divinity of the recently crucified Jesus. The film, shot on location in Tunisia and Bulgaria It premiered at the Capri, Hollywood and the Los Angeles Italia Film Festival. That same year, he appeared in the music video "Kosmosa" sung by the Russian singer Irson Kudikova.

In 2007, Lundgren directed and starred in the Mongolia-based action adventure, Diamond Dogs. Lundgren plays a mercenary hired by a group of fortune hunters to act as their guide and bodyguard. The film, a Canadian-Chinese production, was shot on location in Inner Mongolia. Later in 2007, Lundgren wrote, directed and starred in Missionary Man alongside Charles Solomon Jr.. Described as a "modern western" by Lundgren, He plays a lone, Bible-preaching stranger named Ryder who comes into a small Texas town on his 1970's Harley-Davidson motorcycle to attend the funeral of his good friend J.J., a local Native American carpenter, only to later get mixed up in a series of brawls with a local gang. According to Lundgren, it had long been a desire of his to direct a western, having long been a fan of Clint Eastwood and John Wayne, yet he did not want to spend the time and money building an old western town and hiring horses, so decided to set it in modern times with a motorbike instead of entering the town on a horse in the manner than Clint Eastwood would. Lundgren's co-writer, Frank Valdez's wife's brother happened to be a notable actor working in Texas and invited Lundgren's team to shoot there. The film was shot on location in Waxahachie, south of Dallas and was produced by Andrew Stevens and it was specially screened at the 2008 AFI Dallas Film Festival.

In 2008, Lundgren starred opposite Michael Paré in the direct-to-video action flick Direct Contact. He plays an ex-US Special forces operative on a rescue mission. This was followed by another direct to video film Command Performance (2009), a hostage action drama in which Lundgren, a proficient musician in real life, plays a rock drummer forced to face terrorists at a concert. The film co-starred Canadian pop singer Melissa Smith, playing a world-famous pop singer in the film and his own daughter Ida on her screen debut, who played one of the daughters of the Russian president. The story was inspired by a concert Madonna put on for Russian President Vladimir Putin, although Lundgren has also likened the pop singer to Britney Spears. Filming took place over 5 weeks between August and September 2008 in Sofia, Bulgaria and Moscow, Russia. The film premiered at the Ischia Global Film & Music Festival on 18 July 2009.

In 2009, The Dolph Lundgren Scholarship was instituted in his name, which is awarded to the student with the best grades at Ådalsskolan in Kramfors, the school where he himself studied. Lundgren then reunited with Jean-Claude Van Damme in Universal Soldier: Regeneration, where he plays Andrew Scott's clone. The film was released theatrically in the Middle East and Southeast Asia and directly to video in the United States and other parts of the world. Since its release, the film has received better than average reviews for a straight-to-DVD franchise sequel, with film critic Brian Orndorf giving the film a B, calling it "moody, pleasingly quick-draw, and knows when to quit, making the Universal Soldier brand name bizarrely vital once again." Dread Central gave it 3 out of 5 knives, saying "there is almost nothing but solid b-level action until the credits roll." On the negative side, Pablo Villaça said in his review that while he praised Van Damme's performance, he criticized that of Lundgren and described the film "dull in concept and execution".

Later in 2009, Lundgren directed and starred in the hit-man thriller Icarus (retitled in the US and the UK as The Killing Machine). He plays a businessman named Edward Genn, working for an investment company, who has a shady past as a KGB special agent known as "Icarus". He tries to escape from his past life, but his identity is discovered and he is hunted down, placing the lives of his wife and daughter and himself in jeopardy. Retitled in the US and the UK as The Killing Machine, it opened theatrically in Los Angeles on 10 September 2010, for an exclusive one-week engagement at Laemmele's Sunset 5 Theater in West Hollywood. It was his last directorial effort until 2021.

2010s: Expendables and direct-to-video films 

In 2010, Lundgren made a guest star appearance on the TV series Chuck in the fourth-season premiere episode, "Chuck Versus the Anniversary", as Russian spy Marco, with references to Rocky IV'''s Ivan Drago. He then played a drug-addled assassin in the ensemble action film The Expendables. It was his first American theatrically released film since 1995. The film is about a group of elite mercenaries, tasked with a mission to overthrow a Latin American dictator. It was described by Lundgren as "an old-school, kick-ass action movie where people are fighting with knives and shooting at each other." Film production began on 3 March 2009, with a budget of $82 million. Filming commenced 25 days later in Rio de Janeiro and other locations in Brazil, and later in Louisiana. The film received mixed reviews from critics but was very successful commercially, opening at number one at the box office in the United States, the United Kingdom, China and India.

Lundgren was one of three hosts for the 2010 Melodifestivalen, where the Swedish contribution to the Eurovision Song Contest is selected. In the first installation on 6 February, Lundgren co-hosted the competition together with comedian Christine Meltzer and performer Måns Zelmerlöw. Lundgren's appearance was hailed by critics and audience, particularly his rendition of Elvis Presley's "A Little Less Conversation".

Lundgren played the lead role in Uwe Boll's In the Name of the King 2: Two Worlds, and had supporting roles in Jonas Åkerlund's Small Apartments and a thriller called Stash House. Principal photography for Universal Soldier: Day of Reckoning began on 9 May 2011 in Louisiana, and filming wrapped on One in the Chamber (co-starring Cuba Gooding Jr.) around the same time. The Expendables 2 entered principal photography in late September/early October 2011, with Lundgren reprising his role as Gunner Jensen. Filming wrapped in January 2012, and it was released by Lionsgate on 17 August later that year.

In 2013, Lundgren starred alongside Steve Austin in The Package. Directed by Jesse Johnson, principal photography wrapped in March 2012, and the film was released on 9 February 2013. For a direct-to-DVD film, The Package was not a financial success. In its first week of release, the film debuted at no. 81; grossing $1,469 at the domestic box office. He starred in a number of other films later that year, including Legendary, Battle of the Damned, Ambushed, and Blood of Redemption.

In 2014, Lundgren co-starred opposite Cung Le in the action film Puncture Wounds, and reprised his role as Gunner Jensen for the third time in The Expendables 3. He then wrote, produced, and starred alongside Tony Jaa and Ron Perlman in Skin Trade, an action thriller about human trafficking. Principal photography started on 2 February 2014 in Thailand, and wrapped in Vancouver; April the same year.Friel, Eoin (19 March 2014) "Tony Jaa Interview" , The Action Elite; retrieved 9 March 2015. The film received a limited theatrical release, followed by a Blu-ray and DVD release on 25 August 2015."August 2015 DVD Releases", movieinsider.com; retrieved 20 August 2015. In February, he filmed a cameo for the Coen brothers' 2016 comedy film Hail, Caesar!, portraying a Soviet submarine captain.

On 21 January 2015, Lundgren started filming straight-to-video film Shark Lake on the Mississippi Gulf Coast. This was followed by a further six weeks of filming in the "Reno-Tahoe area". In the film, he portrays Clint Gray, a black-market dealer of exotic species responsible for releasing a dangerous shark into Lake Tahoe. Directed by Jerry Dugan, the film's budget was $2 million. On 23 May, straight-to-video film War Pigs premiered at the GI Film Festival. In the film, Lundgren co-starred (alongside Luke Goss) as Captain Hans Picault, a French Legionnaire who trains a U.S. Army Infantry group to go behind enemy lines and exterminate the Nazis. In August 2015, he started filming Kindergarten Cop 2 in Ontario, Canada, a straight-to-video sequel to the 1990 comedy film that starred Arnold Schwarzenegger.Orange, B. Alan. "First Look at Dolph Lundgren in 'Kindergarten Cop 2'", www.movieweb.com, published 13 August 2015. Retrieved 14 August 2015. He portrays Agent Reed, a law enforcement officer who must go undercover as a kindergarten teacher, in order to recover a missing flash drive from the Federal Witness Protection Program. Throughout that year, he starred in a number of other straight-to-video films, including the crime thriller The Good, the Bad and the Dead and the prison film Riot. He starred in the music video of Imagine Dragons's Believer, which was released on 7 March 2017. In August 2017, he portrayed the future version of Gil Shepard in the Syfy film Sharknado 5: Global Swarming.

In 2018, Black Water, an action thriller, directed by Pasha Patriki was released. Also starred Van Damme, this was their fifth collaboration between both actors as well as the first time they appear together as on-screen allies.Kit, Borys. "Jean-Claude Van Damme, Dolph Lundgren Team for Action Thriller 'Black Water'", The Hollywood Reporter, published 4 January 2017. Retrieved 23 April 2017. Lundgren reprised his role of Ivan Drago from Rocky IV in Creed II, the 2018 sequel to Creed.  He played an older, impoverished Drago in the film, which also introduces the character's son, Viktor. This marked the beginning of what New York Magazine has described as Lundgren's "comeback." Also that year, Lundgren appeared in the DC Extended Universe film Aquaman, from director James Wan, as the underwater king Nereus. Later in 2021, Lundgren starred and directed in the 2021 action film Castle Falls as Richard Ericson, in his first feature film as directed in nearly 12 years.

2020s
In 2022, Lundgren starred in a series of Old Spice advertisments to promote a new antiperspirant line of deoderant spray. The advertisements depicted the 65 year old actor as a young adult doing an "80s action movie spoof."

Training and diet
Although Lundgren has never competed as a professional bodybuilder, he has been closely associated with bodybuilding and fitness since his role as Drago in the mid-1980s. Bodybuilding.com said, "Looking like a man in his 30s rather than his 50s, Lundgren is the poster boy of precise nutrition, supplementation and exercise application that he has practiced for over 35 years." In an interview with them, he claimed to often train up to six days a week, usually one-hour sessions completed in the morning, saying that "it's just one hour a day, and then you can enjoy the other 23 hours". Although he had begun lifting weights as a teenager, he cites co-star Sylvester Stallone as the man who got him into serious bodybuilding for a period in the 1980s after he arrived in the U.S. Stallone had a lasting influence on his fitness regimen and diet, ensuring that he ate a much higher percentage of protein and split his food intake between five or six smaller meals a day. Lundgren has professed never to have been "super strong", saying that, "I'm too tall and my arms are long. I think back then [Rocky IV] I was working with around 300 pounds on the bench and squat."

In a January 2011 interview with GQ he announced he was working on releasing his own range of vitamins and supplements. He wrote an autobiographical fitness book, Train Like an Action Hero: Be Fit Forever'', published in Sweden (by Bonnier Fakta) on 9 August 2011, offering tips he learned over the years to work out in various situations (with a busy schedule and a lot of traveling). It also discusses a detailed account of his earlier life and troubles. He cites a better quality of life as having inspired him to maintain his physical fitness.

When in Los Angeles he trains at the Equinox Gym in Westwood and when at home in Marbella, Spain, he trains at the Qi Sport Gym in Puerto Banús. Lundgren also spars and practices karate aside from weight lifting. He cites dead lifting and squats as the best exercises for muscle building. Lundgren is not a heavy drinker, but has professed on many occasions to being fond of tequila and cocktails, citing his knowledge in chemical engineering as "making really good drinks".

Personal life
Lundgren splits his time between Stockholm and Los Angeles. He speaks Swedish and English fluently, as well as smaller amounts of French, German, Italian, Japanese, and Spanish, but is not fluent in five languages as has often been reported.

He is an avid football fan. He supported Everton F.C. when he lived in Europe, but developed more of an interest in international football tournaments (such as the UEFA European Championship and the FIFA World Cup) after moving to Los Angeles.

During the 1980s, Lundgren had relationships with Jamaican singer Grace Jones and American model Paula Barbieri.  While Lundgren was completing a master's degree in chemical engineering on an exchange program with the University of Sydney in Australia, Jones spotted him at a dance club and hired him as a bodyguard. Lundgren was whisked off to the United States, where he completed his final thesis.

In 1994, he married Anette Qviberg (born 1966), a jewellery designer and fashion stylist, in Marbella. The couple decided they liked Marbella so much that they rented accommodations there for years, before eventually buying a family home there. They have two daughters: Ida Sigrid Lundgren (born 1996) and Greta Eveline Lundgren (born 2001), both born in Stockholm. Lundgren and Qviberg cited the reason for living outside Hollywood was to give their children as normal a childhood as possible. Lundgren's father died in 2000.

In early May 2009, three masked burglars reportedly broke into Lundgren's Marbella home. The burglars tied up and threatened his wife, but fled when they found a family photo and realized that the house was owned by Lundgren. Lundgren later stated he believed the intruders to be Eastern European and had asked contacts in Bulgaria to investigate them, but to no avail. After the incident, Lundgren's elder daughter, Ida, suffered from PTSD. His wife was the "most traumatized", and  they divorced.

Lundgren was in a relationship with Jenny Sandersson from 2011 to 2017. Lundgren became engaged to Norwegian personal trainer Emma Krokdal in June 2020.

Filmography

Awards and honors

Special awards

References

External links

 
 
 

1957 births
Clemson University alumni
Kyokushin kaikan practitioners
Living people
Male actors from Stockholm
KTH Royal Institute of Technology alumni
Swedish chemical engineers
Swedish expatriate male actors in the United States
Swedish Lutherans
Swedish male boxers
Swedish male film actors
Swedish film directors
Swedish male karateka
Swedish male judoka
University of Sydney alumni
Washington State University alumni
20th-century Swedish engineers
20th-century Swedish male actors
21st-century Swedish engineers
21st-century Swedish male actors
21st-century Swedish male writers
Engineers from Stockholm
People from Kramfors Municipality
Scientists from Stockholm
Swedish expatriates in Australia
Swedish expatriates in Spain
Swedish film producers
Swedish male television actors
Writers from Stockholm
Fulbright alumni